The Transportation Security Administration is an American transportation safety organization.

TSA may also refer to:

Organizations
 Technology Student Association
 Tenant Services Authority, a former regulatory body in England
 Thailand Swimming Association, the aquatic sports government of Thailand
 Theosophical Society in America
 The Scout Association, a UK scouting organisation
 The Sports Authority, former name of the defunct sports retailer Sports Authority
 Tourette Syndrome Association, former name of the Tourette Association of America
 Transpacific Stabilization Agreement, a research and discussion forum for the main transpacific container shipping lines 
 Trans States Airlines, US
 Turkish Space Agency, a government agency for national aerospace research in Turkey
 The Salvation Army

Education
 Tattnall Square Academy, Macon, Georgia, US
 Thinking Skills Assessment, a generic university admissions test
 Tiong Se Academy, Chinese school, the Philippines
 The Sharon Academy, Vermont, US
 Territory-wide System Assessment, a Hong Kong academic assessment program
 Tulane School of Architecture, New Orleans, Louisiana, US
 Toledo School for the Arts, a public charter school in Toledo, Ohio

Places
 Taipei Songshan Airport (IATA code)
 Tin Sau stop, Hong Kong (MTR station code)
 Titanium Security Arena, a sports stadium in Australia

Science and technology
 TS/A, a mouse mammary carcinoma cell line
 Temperature swing adsorption, a gas separation technique
 Time Stamping Authority, carrying out cryptographic trusted timestamping
 Trichostatin A, an inhibitor of histone deacetylases
 Trypticase soy agar, a common laboratory plating media
 Tumor-specific antigen

Arts and entertainment
 TSA (band) (Tajne Stowarzyszenie Abstynentów or Teetotallers' Secret Association), a Polish heavy metal/hard rock band 
 Transformation Story Archive, web site archiving amateur fiction
 Toilet Safety Administration, parody of US Transportation Security Administration in TV episode "Reverse Cowgirl" (South Park)

Other uses
 Tax sheltered annuity or 403(b) plan
 Technicien supérieur de l'aviation, a certification in French civil aviation
 Transitional service agreement, a contract used to specify the services delivered by the old owner of a subsidiary organisation when that subsidiary is undergoing a carve out
 Treasury single account, a financial policy in Nigeria